The Manggarai are an ethnic group found in western Flores in the East Nusa Tenggara province, Indonesia. Manggarai people are spread across three regencies in the province, namely the West Manggarai Regency, Manggarai Regency and East Manggarai Regency.

Etymology
The Manggarai people sometimes refer to themselves as Ata Manggarai, which means "people of Manggarai".

Settlements
Manggarai people are one of the aboriginal peoples of the island of Flores. Manggarai settlements cover over 6,700 square kilometers, almost a third of Flores, in the western part of the island.

History
According to historical records, they have been occupied alternately by other tribes such as the Bima people from the island of Sumbawa and the Makassar people from Sulawesi island, Indonesia. As of the late 20th century, there are about 500,000 Manggarai people.

Early state formations of the Manggarai in the 17th century had their first king of Minangkabau descent from the Sultanate of Gowa, Makassar; which led to the spread of Islam on the island of Flores most likely through trading sea-route. In 1727, the Manggarai region was given to the Bima Sultanate as a dowry when a Makassarese princes was married into the Bima royalty. In 1929, the Western part of Flores was separated from the Bima Sultanate. Then, followed by the invasion of the Dutch colonialists in the 20th century and the subsequent Christianization of Manggarai.

Language
The language spoken throughout the region is called Tombo Manggarai, a language with around 43 sub-dialects divided into 5 dialect groups which is very distinct from the languages of ethnic groups to the east and from Indonesian. The 5 dialect groups are Western Manggarai, Central West Manggarai, Central Manggarai, East Manggarai and Far East Manggarai. The latter, separated from other dialects by the Rembong language, is distributed in the north-central part of the island of Flores. It is spoken by about 300,000 people. There are also native speakers of the Rongga language (there are about 5,000 of them) living in three settlements in the southern part of the East Manggarai Regency. This language is not singled out even by most of Manggarai people themselves, because it is considered as part of the Manggarai language.

Culture

Religion
More than 90% of the Manggarai people are Catholics; the eastern Manggarai in the region of Borong are Catholics. Some living in the west profess Sunnism (their number is approximately 33,898 people).  and the population of the central part of the island adheres to traditional beliefs. Traditional beliefs of settlements in the central part of the island include the cult of the supreme creator god, Mori Karaeng, a form of ancestral worship. Massive celebrations are held by the priest to sacrifice buffalos, which are accompanied by ritual dances and battles between the two parties of men in military garb.

Rituals
The Manggarai people are known to have series of ritual as a thanksgiving for the life that has been given to them to live in a certain time period. Among others are:-
 Penti Manggarai, a ceremony of harvest thanksgiving celebration.
 Barong Lodok, a ritual that invites the guardian spirit to the center of Lingko (middle farm).
 Barong Wae, a ritual to invite ancestral spirits to be a watcher over springs.
 Barong Compang, a ceremony of summoning a village guardian spirit at night.
 Wisi Loce, this ceremony is conducted so that all spirits who are invited are able to wait a moment before the climax of the Penti ceremony.
 Libur Kilo, a ceremony of thanksgiving for the welfare of each family in their homes.

Traditional clothing
Initially, the traditional clothing consist of two pieces of fabric, reinforced in front and behind with a cord at the waist and hips. Modern clothing are of the same type as mainstream Indonesian.

Fighting arts

Manggarai people also have a traditional folk sport and war dance called , a form of whip fighting where fighting and parrying each other using a whip and a shield is usually performed by two young men in a large field.  performance usually begins with  dance performances, before the  warriors display their abilities to hit and parry in the competition. The dance is commonly referred to as Tandak Manggarai, a dance performed on stage to predict the outcome of the  competition.

Society and lifestyle
Family relationships are based on the patrilineal line. The Manggarai people recognizes several types of marriages such as matrilateral cross-cousin marriage, Levirate marriage, Sororate marriage, a marriage between the offspring of two sisters that marries the sons of two brothers, and so on. Most monogamous family are formed by Christians, and small groups among Muslims and adherents of traditional beliefs allows Polygyny. The Manggarai people to this day are divided into three social groups namely, aristocrats, community members and descendants of slaves.

The traditional settlement has a circular layout, and the modern is an ordinary one. In the center of the settlement is a round public space on which is a large tree; usually of the Ficus genus and megalithic structures are found. In the past, a settlement could consist of one large house, which could hold up to 200 people. In modern settlements,  usually has from 5 to 20 homes of round or oval shape on stilts, with a high (about 9 meters) conical roof descending to the ground.

In Manggarai settlements, free spaces are paved with huge stones. In the city of Ende, the dead are buried in round holes, which are closed by stones placed on the grave.

Politics
Their political system is clan-based, led by a chief clan called Todo. This people practices patrilineal descent system, and historically they live in villages of which consists at least two clans.

Livelihood
Distribution of handicrafts are such as carving, metalworking and weaving. They also engage in manual tropical farming (they switched from slash-and-burn system to Crop rotation system to grow Upland rice, legumes, vegetables, tobacco, coffee and corn). Animal husbandry is widespread (buffaloes are bred for socially significant animal ceremonies, horses are kept as packs transportation, pigs and chickens). Manggarai people do not hunt nor do they fish.

Dietary
The main food is corn porridge with vegetables and pork (which are only consumed by non-Muslim Manggarai people), as well as palm wine. Rice is served on the table only as a festive meal.

See also
 Mbehel, a West Mangarrai mountain tribe
 Rangko tribe from Sulawesi island

References

Further reading

External links

 Joshua Project — Manggarai Ethnic People in all countries
 Manggarai Map — Satellite Images of Manggarai

Ethnic groups in Indonesia